The Justified & Stripped Tour was a co-headlining concert tour by American recording artists Justin Timberlake and Christina Aguilera. It was launched in support of Timberlake's debut studio album, Justified (2002), and Aguilera's fourth studio album, Stripped (2002). Timberlake announced that he would go on a co-headlining tour at the 2003 American Music Awards, and it was officially announced that Aguilera would be the co-headlined artist of the tour on January 14, 2003. Tour dates were revealed on February 21, 2003; it kicked off on June 4, 2003 in Phoenix, Arizona and visited 45 cities in North America. The Black Eyed Peas were serviced as the tour's supporting act.

The set list was composed generally from Timberlake's Justified and Aguilera's Stripped. However, both artists also added material from their early works, including Timberlake's work with NSYNC and Aguilera's self-titled debut album; she also performed two of Etta James's songs: "At Last" and "I Prefer You". The Justified and Stripped Tour was divided into five segments, two for Aguilera and three for Timberlake, with each segment being followed by an interlude to the next segment, and it ended with an encore, lasting for a total of 160 minutes.

The tour was met with mixed reviews from most contemporary music critics. Some praised the maturities of the two artists, while others criticized their vocal abilities during the tour. They also believed that Aguilera's image during the tour resembled that of American recording artist Cher, and her part concentrated too much on her vocal abilities, while Timberlake's part worked his considerable sex appeal. However, the tour was a commercial success, garnering more than US$30 million and becoming the fifth-highest-grossing tour in 2003. It also became the third-highest-grossing co-headlining tour of the year. In late 2003, the tour's extension, The Stripped Tour was held to promote Aguilera's Stripped without Timberlake's act. An extended play, entitled Justin & Christina, was released exclusively at Target Stores to support the tour.

Development 
When she was asked why they decided to go on tour together, Aguilera replied, "We both put out records around the same time that kind of introduced ourselves to the world as new artists, in a way. So it was just a good time. And I've known Justin since the Mickey Mouse Club days, since we were twelve or thirteen, so we go back in our friendship, and it kind of works."

Concert synopsis

The concert began with the video introduction of "Stripped Intro", featuring Aguilera handcuffed, blindfolded and sitting in a chair as the words "scandal", "gossip" and "lies" flashed across the screen. Backed by a five-piece band and eight back-up dancers, Aguilera strutted out singing "Dirrty" and "Get Mine, Get Yours", with curly black hair, a black and "hot-pink halter with belly-baring plunging neckline", pants and spiked heels. She performed "The Voice Within" as the follow-up, with a long black dress. During the acoustic version of "Come On Over Baby (All I Want Is You)", she gave a speech, "Thank you so much for coming ... I'm getting that feeling again and it's a blessing. Yes, I've grown up a little bit. Now I'm 22... I'm so happy you've grown with me". Aguilera went onstage again, performing the "Egyptian-turned-metal" version "Genie in a Bottle", where she rolled on a giant "X" which portrayed her then newly established alter ego "Xtina". Wearing "hot pink straps attached to her outfit", she slowly unraveled herself as the "genie" in the song, provocatively dancing her way out of the bottle. The performance of "Can't Hold Us Down" featured a pink "spark-shooting" motorcycle. Then, she belted out "Make Over" with the "rhythmic trot of a Spanish spaghetti Western", featuring "chain-link fence".

Following the video interlude of "Loving Me 4 Me", she performed the ballad "Impossible". She later changed into a "silky empire-waisted" red dress to channel her favorite singer, Etta James, and performed two of James' hits, "At Last" and "I Prefer You". The rendition of "Lady Marmalade" from the soundtrack Moulin Rouge! was described as "a playful romp" between four male dancers dressed as sailors and four female members of the troupe in lingerie. During the medley of two Spanish songs from Mi Reflejo, "Contigo en la Distancia" and "Falsas Esperanzas", a male dancer ripped off the skirt she wore, revealing tiny denim boy-cut shorts underneath. Later, she "saucily" replied, "Just because my album name is Stripped, doesn't mean you can take my clothes off". She continued with the "gorgeous ache" of "Walk Away". The performance of "Fighter" "had more feelings and excitements", and the performance version of "What a Girl Wants" was provided with some "well-deserved" dance moves, in which she wore a purple shirt and shorts. Aguilera ended her part with "Beautiful", wearing jeans and a T-shirt which emblazoned with the words "God sees no color".

Timberlake's part began with a video interlude of "Ghetto Blaster", followed by the performance of "Rock Your Body". He yelled, "Scream!", "What's up?", "We got some crazy people in the crowd tonight", he responded. "I'll be your host for this evening. I'm gonna test your knowledge a little bit with this one. Let's see if you can spot this one".

Justin & Christina 

Aguilera and Timberlake released a promotional limited edition extended play (EP) titled Justin & Christina. It was released on July 1, 2003 by RCA, Jive and BMG Records. The EP was released exclusively held at the American retail chain Target. The material featured in the EP included two original compositions from each artist, "That's What Love Can Do" by Aguilera and "Why, When, How" by Timberlake, as well as four remixes of two of Aguilera and Timberlake's own songs.

Track listing

Reception
The Justified and Stripped Tour garnered mixed reviews from contemporary critics. Longtime critic Robert Hilburn for the Los Angeles Times called Aguilera's part "tedious" and her stage persona "uncertain", while praising Timberlake's act, considering him "born for the stage (with) the savvy instincts to put together a show that works. Rather than make himself the constant center of attention, he was comfortable enough at times simply to be part of a talented ensemble." By contrast, the Orange County Registers Ben Wener complimented Aguilera's performance, writing "I'd favor Aguilera's sex-appeal feast over Timberlake's club jam... Christina is simply a more well-rounded entertainer." Meanwhile, he criticized Timberlake's part and compared him to George Michael. Darryl Morder from The Hollywood Reporter was not impressed with either artist, naming the tour "more a case of egofied and cluttered." Morder further said that Aguilera's numbers were "too often swathed in bloated arrangements", while Timberlake's voice was "whiny and thin."

Multiple critics also believed that Aguilera's image during the tour resembled Cher's look during the 1980s. Christina Fuoco from MTV News drew similarities between the two artists: big curly black locks, a black and hot-pink halter with belly-baring plunging neckline, pants, and spiked heels. Writing for the San Francisco Chronicle, Neva Chonin also compared Aguilera to Cher, with "a torso-baring black ensemble, a shock of dark hair exploding from the back of her head". In 2003, the tour was the sixteenth-highest-grossing tour of the year, with a total gross of US$30,261,670. 546,483 tickets were sold out of 592,360 available (approximately 92%), including 23 sellout shows out of 45 (approximately 51%). It was also the third-top-grossing co-headlining tour of the year, only behind Face to Face by Billy Joel and Elton John, and Rocksimus Maximus by Aerosmith and Kiss.

Set lists

Shows

Cancelled shows

See also 
 List of Christina Aguilera concerts
 List of Christina Aguilera concert tours

Notes

References

Christina Aguilera concert tours
Justin Timberlake concert tours
2003 concert tours
Co-headlining concert tours